Richard Patrick Byarugaba is a Ugandan business executive, banker, and entrepreneur. He is the managing director and chief executive officer of the National Social Security Fund (Uganda), a semi-autonomous retirement pension organisation for non-government employees in Uganda. He was also listed in 2012 as one of the wealthiest individuals in Uganda.

Background and education
Byarugaba was born in 1961 in the Western Region of Uganda. He attended Makerere University, Uganda's oldest public institution of tertiary education, graduating with a degree in statistics and economics. He is a qualified accountant with the Association of Chartered Certified Accountants of the United Kingdom (UK). He also holds a diploma in management from Henley Management College, also in the UK.

Work experience
Byarugaba has held various positions over the years, with the majority in Uganda's banking sector. He started as a banking officer at Standard Chartered Uganda (Stanchart), in 1983. By 1992, he had risen to executive director for finance at Stanchart. In 1994, he was transferred to Stanchart's international headquarters in London, as the regional manager for finance, responsible for Africa. He returned to Uganda in 1997, where he joined Nile Bank Limited, a private retail bank. He became managing director of the bank in 2003. In 2007, Barclays, the British financial conglomerate, bought all the shares of Nile Bank Limited for US $27 million (UGX:52 billion). The new owners merged the bank with their existing banking interests in the country to form the existing Barclays Bank (Uganda). Byarugaba moved to Baclays Bank (Uganda) as the chief operating officer.

In 2008, when Global Trust Bank (Uganda) was established, the new owners appointed Byarugaba as managing director of the newly created bank. He held that position until 2010 when he left to become the managing director and chief executive officer of the National Social Security Fund (Uganda).

Byarugaba has also worked with Hospice Africa, the Palliative Care Association of Uganda, and the Uganda Institute of Banking and Financial Services. When he resigned from Global Trust Bank, he was the treasurer of the Uganda Bankers Association.

See also

 List of wealthiest people in Uganda
 List of banks in Uganda
 Geraldine Ssali Busuulwa

References

External links
 Website of National Social Security Fund (Uganda)
 Profile of Richard Byarugaba

1961 births
Living people
Makerere University alumni
Ugandan accountants
Ugandan bankers
Alumni of Henley Management College
People from Western Region, Uganda
Ugandan statisticians
Ugandan chief executives
Chief operating officers
Ugandan businesspeople
Ugandan business executives